Polydiscidium is a genus of fungi in the family Helotiaceae. This is a monotypic genus, containing the single species Polydiscidium martynii.

References

External links
Polydiscidium at Index Fungorum

Helotiaceae
Monotypic Ascomycota genera